Norman James Waidyaratna (born 20 February 1917) was a Ceylonese politician. Former Deputy speaker and chairman of committees of the Parliament of Sri Lanka and the member of parliament for Balapitiya.     

He first contested from the Rathgama Electoral District unsuccessfully in the March 1960 parliamentary election, July 1960 parliamentary election and a by election in 1961. However, he successfully contested the 1977 parliamentary election from Balapitiya.

References

1917 births
Year of death missing
Deputy speakers and chairmen of committees of the Parliament of Sri Lanka
Members of the 8th Parliament of Sri Lanka
United National Party politicians
People from British Ceylon